Advanced Surface Movement Guidance and Control System is a system at airports having a surveillance infrastructure consisting of a Non-Cooperative Surveillance (e.g. SMR, Microwave Sensors, Optical Sensors etc.) and Cooperative Surveillance (e.g. Multilateration systems). A-SMGCS has 4 levels, level 1 and 2 have been validated by EUROCONTROL Airport Operations and Environment division in Eurocontrol located in Brussels, Belgium and work is ongoing to verify requirements for further implementation levels in coordination with ICAO, FAA etc.

ICAO Definition 
ICAO Doc 9830 defines A-SMGCS as follows:

Advanced surface movement guidance and control system (A-SMGCS). A system providing routing, guidance and surveillance for the control of aircraft and vehicles in order to maintain the declared surface movement rate under all weather conditions within the aerodrome visibility operational level (AVOL) while maintaining the required level of safety.

List of Airports with FAA approved SMGCS Plans

See also 
Runway Awareness and Advisory System
Follow the Greens

References

Further reading 
Advanced Surface Movement Guidance and Control Systems (A-SMGCS) Manual
Validation Master Plan for A-SMGCS Implementation Level I
Validation Master Plan for A-SMGCS Implementation Level II

External links 
EUROCONTROL Airport Operations and Environment Homepage
Eurocontrol A-SMGCS website

International Cooperation on Airport Surveillance: ICAS
 Sensis Corporation A-SMGCS website

Air traffic control